Inver House Distillers Limited is a malt whisky distiller, based in Airdrie, Scotland. The company is a subsidiary of ThaiBev, one of the largest alcoholic-beverage companies in Southeast Asia.

Inver House Distillers owns and operates five distilleries: Balblair distillery, Balmenach distillery, Knockdhu distillery, Pulteney distillery, and Speyburn distillery, and sells blended whisky under their own name.

History
The company was established in 1964 as a subsidiary of the American company, Publicker Industries of Philadelphia. Publicker Industries had successfully launched Inver House Rare, a brand of blended Scotch whisky in 1956. However, as a result of industry demand, there were not sufficient stocks to meet sales.

Under the chairmanship of Mr S. S. Neuman, a site was acquired at Airdrie in March 1964, and a fully integrated complex was constructed, including 2 malt distilleries—Glenflagler and Killyloch—and a grain distillery Garnheath.

Following the death of the founder, there was a period of decline in the fortunes of the company.

In 1979, Standard Brands acquired Inver House from Publicker. The operations became the subject of a management buyout in January 1988. The company was then sold by the management to become a wholly owned subsidiary of International Beverage Holdings (InterBev), the international arm of Singapore-listed Thai Beverage Public Company Limited (ThaiBev) in 2006.

Products
Heather Cream was a Scottish cream liqueur made from cream and single malt Scotch whisky from Balblair distillery. It was first produced in 1980. A relaunch in 2000 involved adding vanilla and chocolate to the blend. It was discontinued in the late 2010s.

References

External links

Brand websites
 

Scottish malt whisky
1964 establishments in Scotland
Companies based in North Lanarkshire
Airdrie, North Lanarkshire
British companies established in 1964 
Food and drink companies established in 1964